Summer EP is a 2006 release by the indie rock band Sherwood. During the spring of 2006, AbsolutePunk.net offered a 5-song version of this album to download for free. Later that year, a physical version with two extra tracks was released for sale at the band's live performances and online.

Track listing
The Only Song  – 3:18 
Middle Of The Night  – 3:14 
This Airplane Is A Ribbon  – 3:06 
I'm Asking Her To Stay  – 2:29 
The Simple Life  – 3:08 
A Different Light  – 2:53 
My Dear Friend  – 1:54

External links
Sherwood's Official Website
AbsolutePunk.net page

2006 EPs
Sherwood (band) EPs